Carex halleriana is a species of sedge found on rocky and grassy slopes. It occurs from Western Asia to southern Europe and northwest Africa.

References

halleriana
Plants described in 1779
Flora of Europe
Flora of Malta